Haplusia is a genus of gall midges and wood midges in the family Cecidomyiidae. There are more than 20 described species in Haplusia.

Species
These 22 species belong to the genus Haplusia:

 Haplusia afrotropica Jaschhof
 Haplusia alexanderi Felt, 1921
 Haplusia bella (Skuse, 1888)
 Haplusia braziliensis Felt, 1915
 Haplusia brevipalpis (Rao, 1951)
 Haplusia cincta Felt, 1912
 Haplusia elliptica (Rao, 1956)
 Haplusia funebris Plakidas, 2007
 Haplusia fusca (Felt, 1908)
 Haplusia heteroptera Mamaev & Spungis, 1980
 Haplusia hondrui (Mamaev, 1964)
 Haplusia indica (Grover, 1970)
 Haplusia longipalpia (Rao, 1951)
 Haplusia longipalpis (Mamaev, 1964)
 Haplusia obscuripes (Mamaev, 1968)
 Haplusia pallida (Mamaev, 1966)
 Haplusia palpata (Mamaev, 1966)
 Haplusia plumipes Karsch, 1877
 Haplusia rubra (Felt, 1908)
 Haplusia spiculosa (Barnes, 1927)
 Haplusia spinigera Spungis, 1985
 Haplusia stricta Fedotova & Sidorenko, 2005

References

Further reading

 
 
 
 
 

Cecidomyiidae genera
Articles created by Qbugbot